Centerville (also Centreville) is an unincorporated community in the Town of Trempealeau, Trempealeau County, Wisconsin, United States.

Description
The community is located at the intersection of Wisconsin Highway 35, Wisconsin Highway 93, and Wisconsin Highway 54 along the Great River Road. Centerville uses the 608 area code.

The Centerville Curling Club was organized in 1947, with three sheets of curling ice. A new four-sheet facility was built in 1996 in conjunction with the Trempealeau Town Hall, although the original building still stands.

Centerville is the childhood home of Dan Guillou, a 1988 graduate of GET HS and a member of the 2000 US Paralympic Wheelchair Rugby team that won a gold medal in Sydney.

References

External links

Unincorporated communities in Wisconsin
Unincorporated communities in Trempealeau County, Wisconsin